Dacian  is an extinct language, generally believed to be a member of the Indo-European family, that was spoken in the Carpathian region in antiquity.
In the 1st century, it was probably the predominant language of the ancient regions of Dacia and Moesia and possibly of some surrounding regions.
The language was extinct by the 4th century AD.

While there is general agreement among scholars that Dacian was an Indo-European language, there are divergent opinions about its place within the IE family:
 Dacian was a language distinct from Thracian but closely related to it, belonging to the same branch of the Indo-European family (a "Thraco-Dacian", or "Daco-Thracian" branch has been theorised by some linguists).
 Dacian, Thracian, the Baltic languages (Duridanov also adds Pelasgian) formed a distinct branch of Indo-European, e.g. Schall (1974), Duridanov (1976), Radulescu (1987) and Mayer (1996).
 Daco-Moesian was the ancestor of Albanian, belonging to a branch other than Thracian, but closely related to Thracian and distinct from Illyrian. This is a theory proposed by Georgiev (1977).

The Dacian language is poorly documented. Unlike Phrygian, which is documented by c. 200 inscriptions, only one Dacian inscription is believed to have survived. The Dacian names for a number of medicinal plants and herbs may survive in ancient literary texts, including about 60 plant-names in Dioscorides. About 1,150 personal names and 900 toponyms may also be of Dacian origin. A few hundred words in modern Romanian and Albanian may have originated in ancient Balkan languages such as Dacian (see List of Romanian words of possible Dacian origin). Linguists have reconstructed about 100 Dacian words from placenames using established techniques of comparative linguistics, although only 20–25 such reconstructions had achieved wide acceptance by 1982.

Origin
There is scholarly consensus that Dacian was a member of the Indo-European family of languages. These descended, according to the two leading theories of the expansion of IE languages, from a proto-Indo European (proto-IE) tongue that originated in an urheimat ("original homeland") in S. Russia/ Caucasus region, (Kurgan hypothesis) or in central Anatolia (Anatolian hypothesis). According to both theories, proto-IE reached the Carpathian region no later than c. 2500 BC. Supporters of both theories have suggested this region as IE's secondary urheimat, in which the differentiation of proto-IE into the various European language-groups (e.g. Italic, Germanic, Balto-Slavic, Celtic) began. There is thus considerable support for the thesis that Dacian developed in the Carpathian region during the third millennium BC, although its evolutionary pathways remains uncertain.

According to one scenario, proto-Thracian populations emerged during the Bronze Age from the fusion of the indigenous Eneolithic (Chalcolithic) population with the intruders of the transitional Indo-Europeanization Period. From these proto-Thracians, in the Iron Age, developed the Dacians / North Thracians of the Danubian-Carpathian Area on the one hand and the Thracians of the eastern Balkan Peninsula on the other.

According to Georgiev, the Dacian language was spread south of the Danube by tribes from Carpathia, who reached the central Balkans in the period 2000–1000 BC, with further movements (e.g. the Triballi tribe) after 1000 BC, until c. 300 BC. According to the ancient geographer Strabo, Daco-Moesian was further spread into Asia Minor in the form of Mysian by a migration of the Moesi people; Strabo asserts that Moesi and Mysi were variants of the same name.

Sources

Many characteristics of the Dacian language are disputed or unknown. No lengthy texts in Dacian exist, only a few glosses and personal names in ancient Greek and Latin texts. No Dacian-language inscriptions have been discovered, except some of names in the Latin or Greek alphabet. What is known about the language derives from:

 Placenames, river-names and personal names, including the names of kings. The coin inscription KOΣON (Koson) may also be a personal name, of the king who issued the coin.
 The Dacian names of about fifty plants written in Greek and Roman sources (see List of Dacian plant names). Etymologies have been established for only a few of them.
 Substratum words found in Romanian, the language that is spoken today in most of the region once occupied by Dacian-speakers. These include about 400 words of uncertain origin. However, the value of the substratum words as a source for the Dacian language is limited because there is no certainty that these are of Dacian origin. This can be seen in the Dicționar Explicativ al Limbii Române (DEX), which shows multiple possible etymologies for most of the words:
 Many of the words may not be "substratum" at all, as Latin etymologies have been proposed for them. These are inherently more likely than a Dacian origin, as the Romanian language is descended from Latin, not Dacian e.g.  ("snail") may derive from Latin /proto-Romance *limace (cf. It. ), by metathesis of "m" with "l".
 Some may derive from other little-known ancient languages at some time spoken in Dacia or Moesia: for example, the Iranian Sarmatian, or the Turkic Pannonian Avar, Bulgar or Cuman languages, or, conceivably, some unknown pre-Indo-European language(s) of the Carpathians or Balkans. An illustration of the latter possibility are pre-Indo-European substratum (i.e. Iberian/Basque) in Spanish e.g. "fox" = , from Basque , instead of proto-Romance *vulpe. A pre-Indo-European origin has been proposed for several Romanian substratum words e.g. ,   ("fir-tree").
 About 160 of the Romanian substratum words have cognates in Albanian. A possible example is Romanian  ("fir-tree"), Alb. cognate  (same meaning). Duridanov has reconstructed *skuia as a Dacian word for fir-tree.
 The numerous Romanian substratum words that have cognates in Bulgarian may derive from Thracian, which may have been a different language from Dacian (see below, Thracian).

 ("dragon"), ascribed a Dacian origin by some scholars, exemplifies the etymological uncertainties. It. ), or ancient Greek  ("monster"); or as a cognate of Alb. ("water-snake"). DEX argues that these etymologies, save the Albanian one, are dubious, but they are no more so than the unverifiable assertion that  is derived from an unknown Dacian word. Another possibility is that  could be a Celtic derivation cf. the Irish mythical giant Balor ( Balar), who could kill with flashes of light from his eye or with his poisonous breath.

The substratum words have been used, in some cases, to corroborate Dacian words reconstructed from place- and personal names e.g. Dacian * = "white" (from personal name Balius), Romanian  = "white-haired" However, even in this case, it cannot be determined with certainty whether the Romanian word derives from the presumed Dacian word or from its Old Slavic cognate belu.

Geographical extent

Linguistic area
Dacian was probably one of the major languages of south-eastern Europe, spoken in the area between the Danube, Northern Carpathians, the Dnister River and the Balkans, and the Black Sea shore. According to historians, as a result of the linguistic unity of the Getae and Dacians that are found in the records of ancient writers Strabo, Cassius Dio, Trogus Pompeius, Appian, and Pliny the Elder, contemporary historiography often uses the term Geto-Dacians to refer to the people living in the area between the Carpathians, the Haemus (Balkan) Mountains, the Black Sea, Dnister River, Northern Carpathians, and middle Danube. Strabo gave more specific information, recording that "the Dacians speak the same language as the Getae" a dialect of the Thracian language. The information provided by the Greek geographer is complemented by other literary, linguistic, and archaeological evidence. Accordingly, the Geto-Dacians may have occupied territory in the west and north-west, as far as Moravia and the middle Danube, to the area of present-day Serbia in the south-west, and as far as the Haemus Mountains (Balkans) in the south. The eastern limit of the territory inhabited by the Geto-Dacians may have been the shore of the Black Sea and the Tyras River (Dnister), possibly at times reaching as far as the Bug River, the northern limit including the Trans-Carpathian westernmost Ukraine and southern Poland.

Over time, some peripheral areas of the Geto-Dacians' territories were affected by the presence of other people, such as the Celts in the west, the Illyrians in the south-west, the Greeks and Scythians in the east and the Bastarnae in the north-east. Nevertheless, between the Danube River (West), the Haemus Mountains (S), the Black Sea (E), the Dniester River (NE) and the northern Carpathians, a continuous Geto-Dacian presence as majority was permanently maintained, according to some scholars. According to the Bulgarian linguist Georgiev, the Daco-Mysian region included Dacia (approximately contemporary Romania and Hungary east of the Tisza River, Mysia (Moesia) and Scythia Minor (contemporary Dobrogea).

Chronology

1st century BC
In 53 BC, Julius Caesar stated that the lands of the Dacians started on the eastern edge of the Hercynian Forest. This corresponds to the period between 82 and 44 BC, when the Dacian state reached its widest extent during the reign of King Burebista: in the west it may have extended as far as the middle Danube River valley in present-day Hungary, in the east and north to the Carpathians in present-day Slovakia and in the south to the lower Dniester valley in present-day south-western Ukraine and the western coast of the Black Sea as far as Appollonia. At that time, some scholars believe, the Dacians built a series of hill-forts at Zemplin (Slovakia), Mala Kopania (Ukraine), Oncești, Maramureș (Romania) and Solotvyno (Ukraine). The Zemplin settlement appears to belong to a Celto-Dacian horizon, as well as the river Patissus (Tisa)'s region, including its upper stretch, according to Shchukin (1989). According to Parducz (1956) Foltiny (1966), Dacian archaeological finds extend to the west of Dacia, and occur along both banks of the Tisza. Besides the possible incorporation of a part of Slovakia into the Dacian state of Burebista, there was also Geto-Dacian penetration of south-eastern Poland, according to Mielczarek (1989). The Polish linguist Milewski Tadeusz (1966 and 1969) suggests that in the southern regions of Poland appear names that are unusual in northern Poland, possibly related to Dacian or Illyrian names. On the grounds of these names, it has been argued that the region of the Carpathian and Tatra Mountains was inhabited by Dacian tribes linguistically related to the ancestors of modern Albanians.

Also, a formal statement by Pliny indicated the river Vistula as the western boundary of Dacia, according to Nicolet (1991). Between the Prut and the Dniester, the northern extent of the appearance of Geto-Dacian elements in the 4th century BC coincides roughly with the extent of the present-day Republic of Moldova, according to Mielczarek.

According to Müllenhoff (1856), Schütte (1917), Urbańczyk (2001) and Matei-Popescu (2007), Agrippa's commentaries mention the river Vistula as the western boundary of Dacia. Urbańczyk (1997) speculates that according to Agrippa's commentaries, and the map of Agrippa (before 12 BC), the Vistula river separated Germania and Dacia. This map is lost and its contents are unknown However, later Roman geographers, including Ptolemy (AD 90 – c. AD 168) (II.10, III.7) and Tacitus (AD 56 – AD 117) considered the Vistula as the boundary between Germania and Sarmatia Europaea, or Germania and Scythia.

1st century AD
Around 20 AD, Strabo wrote the Geographica that provides information regarding the extent of regions inhabited by the Dacians. On its basis, Lengyel and Radan (1980), Hoddinott (1981) and Mountain (1998) consider that the Geto-Dacians inhabited both sides of the Tisza river before the rise of the Celtic Boii and again after the latter were defeated by the Dacians. The hold of the Dacians between the Danube and the Tisza appears to have been tenuous. However, the Hungarian archaeologist Parducz (1856) argued for a Dacian presence west of the Tisza dating from the time of Burebista. According to Tacitus (AD 56 – AD 117) Dacians were bordering Germany in the south-east while Sarmatians bordered it in the east.

In the 1st century AD, the Iazyges settled in the west of Dacia, on the plain between the Danube and the Tisza rivers, according to some scholars' interpretation of Pliny's text: "The higher parts between the Danube and the Hercynian Forest (Black Forest) as far as the winter quarters of Pannonia at Carnuntum and the plains and level country of the German frontiers there are occupied by the Sarmatian Iazyges, while the Dacians whom they have driven out hold the mountains and forests as far as the river Theiss". Archaeological sources indicate that the local Celto-Dacian population retained its specificity as late as the 3rd century AD. Archaeological finds dated to the 2nd century AD, after the Roman conquest, indicate that during that period, vessels found in some of the Iazygian cemeteries reveal fairly strong Dacian influence, according to Mocsy. M. Párducz (1956) and Z. Visy (1971) reported a concentration of Dacian-style finds in the Cris-Mures-Tisza region and in the Danube bend area near Budapest. These maps of finds remain valid today, but they have been complemented with additional finds that cover a wider area, particularly the interfluvial region between the Danube and Tisza. However, this interpretation has been invalidated by late 20th-century archaeology, which has discovered Sarmatian settlements and burial sites all over the Hungarian Plain on both sides of the Tisza e.g. Gyoma in south-eastern Hungary and Nyiregyhaza in north-eastern Hungary. The Barrington Atlas shows the Iazyges occupying both sides of Tisza (map 20).

2nd century AD

Written a few decades after the Roman conquest of Dacia 105–106 AD, Ptolemy's Geographia defined the boundaries of Dacia. There is a consensus among scholars that Ptolemy's Dacia was the region between the rivers Tisza, Danube, upper Dniester, and Siret. The mainstream of historians accepted this interpretation: Avery (1972) Berenger (1994) Fol (1996) Mountain (1998), Waldman Mason (2006). Ptolemy also provided Dacian toponyms in the Upper Vistula (Polish: Wisła) river basin in Poland: Susudava and Setidava (with a manuscript variant Getidava. This may be an echo of Burebista's expansion. It appears that this northern expansion of the Dacian language as far as the Vistula river lasted until 170–180 AD when the Hasdings, a Germanic tribe, expelled a Dacian group from this region, according to Schütte (1917) and Childe (1930). This Dacian group is associated by Schütte (1952) with towns having the specific Dacian language ending 'dava' i.e. Setidava. A previous Dacian presence that ended with the Hasdings' arrival is considered also by  who says that the Hasdings Vandals "attempted to take control of lands which had previously belonged to a free Dacian group called the Costoboci" Several tribes on the northern slopes of the Carpathians were mentioned that are generally considered Thraco-Dacian, i.e. Arsietae (Upper Vistula), Biessi / Biessoi and Piengitai. Schütte (1952) associated the Dacian tribe of Arsietae with the Arsonion town. The ancient documents attest names with the Dacian name ending -dava 'town' in the Balto-Slavic territory, in the country of Arsietae tribe, at the sources of the Vistula river. The Biessi inhabited the foothills of the Carpathian Mountains, which on Ptolemy's map are located on the headwaters of the Dnister and Sian Rivers, the right-bank Carpathian tributary of the Vistula river. The Biessi (Biessoi) probably left their name to the mountain chain of Bieskides that continues the Carpathian Mountains towards the north (Schütte 1952). Ptolemy (140 AD) lists only Germanic or Balto-Slavic tribes, and no Dacians,on both sides of the Vistula (ref: II.10; III.7), as does the Barrington Atlas (map 19).

After the Marcomannic Wars (166–180 AD), Dacian groups from outside Roman Dacia had been set in motion, and thus were the 12,000 Dacians "from the neighbourhood of Roman Dacia sent away from their own country". Their native country could have been the Upper Tisza region but other places cannot be excluded.

Dacian linguistic zone in the early Roman imperial era (30 BC – AD 100)

Historical linguistic overview
Mainstream scholarship believes the Dacian language had become established as the predominant language north of the Danube in Dacia well before 1000 BC and south of the river, in Moesia, before 500 BC.

Starting around 400 BC, Celtic groups, moving out of their La Tène cultural heartland in southern Germany/eastern Gaul, penetrated and settled south-eastern Europe as far as the Black Sea and into Anatolia. By c. 250 BC, much of the modern states of Austria, Slovakia, Hungary and Romania, and Bessarabia and Moesia, were under Celtic cultural influence and probably political domination in many regions. This migratory process brought Celtic material culture, especially advanced in metallurgy, to the Illyrian and Dacian tribes. Especially intensive Celtic settlement, as evidenced by concentrations of La Tène-type cemeteries, took place in Austria, Slovakia, the Hungarian Plain, Transylvania, Bessarabia and eastern Thrace. Central Transylvania appears to have become a Celtic enclave or unitary kingdom, according to Batty. It is likely that during the period of Celtic pre-eminence, the Dacian language was eclipsed by Celtic dialects in Transylvania. In Moesia, South of the Danube, there was also extensive Celticisation. An example is the Scordisci tribe of Moesia Superior, reported by the ancient historian Livy to be Celtic-speaking and whose culture displays Celtic features.

By 60 BC, Celtic political hegemony in the region appears to have collapsed, and the indigenous Dacian tribes throughout the region appear to have reasserted their identity and political independence. This process may have been partly due to the career of the Getan king Burebista (ruled ca 80 – 44 BC), who appears to have coalesced several Getic and Dacian tribes under his leadership. It is likely that in this period, the Dacian language regained its former predominance in Transylvania.

In 29–26 BC, Moesia was conquered and annexed by the Romans. There followed an intensive process of Romanisation. The Danube, as the new frontier of the empire and main fluvial supply route for the Roman military, was soon dotted with forts and supply depots, which were garrisoned by several legions and many auxiliary units. Numerous colonies of Roman army veterans were established. The presence of the Roman military resulted in a huge influx of non-Dacian immigrants, such as soldiers, their dependents, ancillary workers and merchants, from every part of the Roman Empire, especially from the rest of the Balkans, into Moesia. It is likely that by the time the emperor Trajan invaded Dacia (101–6), the Dacian language had been largely replaced by Latin in Moesia.

The conquest of Dacia saw a similar process of Romanisation north of the Danube, so that by 200 AD, Latin was probably predominant in the zone permanently occupied by the Romans. In addition, it appears that some unoccupied parts of the dava zone were overrun, either before or during the Dacian Wars, by Sarmatian tribes; for example, eastern Wallachia, which had fallen under the Roxolani by 68 AD. By around 200 AD, it is likely that the Dacian language was confined to those parts of the dava zone occupied by the Free Dacian groups, which may have amounted to little more than the eastern Carpathians.

Under the emperor Aurelian (r. 270-275), the Romans withdrew their administration and armed forces, and possibly a significant proportion of the provincial population, from the part of Dacia they ruled. The subsequent linguistic status of this region is disputed. Traditional Romanian historiography maintains that a Latin-speaking population persisted into medieval times, to form the basis of today's Romanian-speaking inhabitants. But this hypothesis lacks evidential basis (e.g. the absence of any post-275 Latin inscriptions in the region, other than on imported Roman coins/artefacts). What is certain is that by AD 300, the entire North Danubian region had fallen under the political domination of Germanic-speaking groups, a hegemony that continued until c. AD 500: the Goths held overall hegemony, and under them, lesser Germanic tribes such as the Taifali and Gepids. Some historians consider that the region became Germanic-speaking during this period. At least one part, Wallachia, may have become Slavic-speaking by AD 600, as it is routinely referred to Sklavinía (Greek for "Land of the Slavs") by contemporary Byzantine chroniclers. The survival of the Dacian language in this period is impossible to determine, due to a complete lack of documentation. However, it is generally believed that the language was extinct by AD 600.

Dacia and Moesia: zone of toponyms ending in -dava

At the start of the Roman imperial era (30 BC), the Dacian language was probably predominant in the ancient regions of Dacia and Moesia (although these regions probably contained several enclaves of Celtic and Germanic speakers). Strabo's statement that the Moesian people spoke the same language as the Dacians and Getae is consistent with the distribution of placenames, attested in Ptolemy's Geographia, which carry the Dacian suffix -dava ("town" or "fort").

North of the Danube, the dava-zone is largely consistent with Ptolemy's definition of Dacia's borders (III.8.1–3) i.e. the area contained by the river Ister (Danube) to the south, the river Thibiscum (Timiș) to the west, the upper river Tyras (Dniester) to the north and the river Hierasus (Siret) to the east. To the west, it appears that the -dava placenames in Olteanu's map lie within the line of the Timiş, extended northwards. However, four davas are located beyond the Siret, Ptolemy's eastern border. But three of these, Piroboridava, Tamasidava and Zargidava, are described by Ptolemy as pará (Gr."very close") to the Siret: Piroboridava, the only one securely located, was 3 km from the Siret. The location of Clepidava is uncertain: Olteanu locates it in north-east Bessarabia, but Georgiev places it further west, in south-west Ukraine, between the upper reaches of the Siret and Dniester rivers.

South of the Danube, a dialect of Dacian called Daco-Moesian was probably predominant in the region known to the Romans as Moesia, which was divided by them into the Roman provinces of Moesia Superior (roughly modern Serbia) and Moesia Inferior (modern northern Bulgaria as far as the Balkan range plus Roman Dobruja region). This is evidenced by the distribution of -dava placenames, which occur in the eastern half of Moesia Superior and all over Inferior. These regions were inhabited predominantly by tribes believed to have been Dacian-speaking, such as the Triballi, Moesi and Getae.

However, the dava-zone was not exclusively or uniformly Dacian-speaking during historical times. Significant Celtic elements survived there into the 2nd century AD: Ptolemy (III.8.3) lists two Celtic peoples, the Taurisci and Anartes, as resident in the northernmost part of Dacia, in the northern Carpathians. The partly Celtic Bastarnae are also attested in this region in literature and the archaeological record during the 1st century BC; they probably remained in the 1st century AD, according to Batty.

Other regions
It has been argued that the zone of Dacian speech extended beyond the confines of Dacia, as defined by Ptolemy, and Moesia. An extreme view, presented by some scholars, is that Dacian was the main language spoken between the Baltic Sea and the Black and Aegean seas. But the evidence for Dacian as a prevalent language outside Dacia and Moesia appears inconclusive:

Bessarabia
To the east, beyond the Siret river, it has been argued by numerous scholars that Dacian was also the main language of the modern regions of Moldavia and Bessarabia, at least as far east as the river Dniester. The main evidence used to support this hypothesis consists of three -dava placenames which Ptolemy located just east of the Siret; and the mainstream identification as ethnic-Dacian of two peoples resident in Moldavia: the Carpi and Costoboci. However, the Dacian ethnicity of the Carpi and Costoboci is disputed in academic circles, and they have also been variously identified as Sarmatian, Germanic, Celtic or proto-Slavic. Numerous non-Dacian peoples, both sedentary and nomadic, the Scytho-Sarmatian Roxolani and Agathyrsi, Germanic/Celtic Bastarnae and Celtic Anartes, are attested to in the ancient sources and in the archaeological record as inhabiting this region. The linguistic status of this region during the Roman era must therefore be considered uncertain. It is likely that a great variety of languages were spoken. If there was a lingua franca spoken by all inhabitants of the region, it was not necessarily Dacian: it could as likely have been Celtic or Germanic or Sarmatian.

Balkans
To the south, it has been argued that the ancient Thracian language was a dialect of Dacian, or vice versa, and that therefore the Dacian linguistic zone extended over the Roman province of Thracia, occupying modern-day Bulgaria south of the Balkan Mountains, northern Greece and European Turkey, as far as the Aegean sea. But this theory, based on the testimony of the Augustan-era geographer Strabo's work Geographica VII.3.2 and 3.13, is disputed; opponents argue that Thracian was a distinct language from Dacian, either related or unrelated. (see Relationship with Thracian, below, for a detailed discussion of this issue).

Anatolia

According to some ancient sources, notably Strabo, the northwestern section of the Anatolian peninsula, namely the ancient regions of Bithynia, Phrygia and Mysia, were occupied by tribes of Thracian or Dacian origin and thus spoke dialects of the Thracian or Dacian languages (which, Strabo claimed, were in turn closely related). However, the link between Dacian and Thracian has been disputed by some scholars, as has the link between these two languages and Phrygian.

According to Strabo (VII.3.2) and Herodotus, the people of Bithynia in northwest Anatolia originated from two Thracian tribes, the Bithyni and Thyni, which migrated from their original home around the river Strymon in Thrace. Therefore, they spoke the Thracian language. In addition, Strabo (VII.3.2) claims that the neighbouring Phrygians were also descended from a Thracian tribe, the Briges, and spoke a language similar to Thracian. In fact, it has been established that both Bithynians and Phrygians spoke the Phrygian language. Phrygian is better documented than Thracian and Dacian, as some 200 inscriptions in the language survive. Study of these has led mainstream opinion to accept the observation of the ancient Greek philosopher Plato (Cratylus 410a) that Phrygian showed strong affinities to Greek. Georgiev argued in one article that Phrygian originally belonged to the same IE branch as Greek and Ancient Macedonian (which did not include Thracian or Dacian), but later adopted the view that Phrygian constituted a separate branch of Indo-European, (also unrelated to Thracian or Dacian). This position is currently favoured by mainstream scholarship.

In addition, Strabo (VII.3.2) equates the Moesi people of the Danubian basin with the Mysi (Mysians), neighbours of the Phrygians in NW Anatolia, stating that the two forms were Greek and Latin variants of the same name. The Mysians, he adds, were Moesi who had migrated to Anatolia and also spoke the Dacian language. Georgiev accepts Strabo's statement, dubbing the language of the Moesi "Daco-Mysian". However, there is insufficient evidence about either Dacian or the Mysian language, both of which are virtually undocumented, to verify Strabo's claim. It is possible that Strabo made a false identification based solely on the similarity between the two tribal names, which may have been coincidental.

Hungarian Plain
The hypothesis that Dacian was widely spoken to the north-west of Dacia is primarily based on the career of Dacian king Burebista, who ruled approximately between 80 and 44 BC. According to Strabo, Burebista coalesced the Geto-Dacian tribes under his leadership and conducted military operations as far as Pannonia and Thracia. Although Strabo appears to portray these campaigns as short-term raids for plunder and to punish his enemies, several Romanian scholars have argued, on the basis of controversial interpretation of archaeological data, that they resulted in longer-term Dacian occupation and settlement of large territories beyond the dava zone.

Some scholars have asserted that Dacian was the main language of the sedentary population of the Hungarian Plain, at least as far as the river Tisza, and possibly as far as the Danube. Statements by ancient authors such as Caesar, Strabo and Pliny the Elder have been controversially interpreted as supporting this view, but these are too vague or ambiguous to be of much geographical value. There is little hard evidence to support the thesis of a large ethnic-Dacian population on the Plain:
 Toponyms: Ptolemy (III.7.1) provides 8 placenames for the territory of the Iazyges Metanastae (i.e. the Hungarian Plain). None of these carry the Dacian -dava suffix. At least three -Uscenum, Bormanum and the only one which can be located with confidence, Partiscum (Szeged, Hungary) – have been identified as Celtic placenames by scholars.
 Archaeology: Concentrations of La Tène-type cemeteries suggest that the Hungarian Plain was the scene of heavy Celtic immigration and settlement in the period 400–260 BC (see above). During the period 100 BC – AD 100, the archaeology of the sedentary population of the Plain has been interpreted by some dated scholars as showing Dacian (Mocsy 1974) or Celto-Dacian (Parducz 1956) features. However, surveys of the results of excavations using modern scientific methods, e.g. Szabó (2005) and Almássy (2006), favour the view that the sedentary population of the Hungarian Plain in this period was predominantly Celtic and that any Dacian-style features were probably the results of trade. Of 94 contemporaneous sites excavated between 1986 and 2006, the vast majority have been identified as probably Celtic, while only two as possibly Dacian, according to Almássy, who personally excavated some of the sites. Almássy concludes: "In the Great Hungarian Plain, we have to count on a sporadic Celtic village network in which the Celtic inhabitants lived mixed with the people of the Scythian Age [referring to traces of an influx of Scythians during the 1st century BC], that could have continued into the Late Celtic Period without significant changes. This system consisted of small, farm-like settlements interspersed with a few relatively large villages... In the 1st century AD nothing refers to a significant immigration of Dacian people." Visy (1995) concurs that there is little archaeological evidence of a Dacian population on the Plain before its occupation by the Sarmatians in the late 1st century AD.
 Epigraphy: Inscription AE (1905) 14 records a campaign on the Hungarian Plain by the Augustan-era general Marcus Vinucius, dated to 10 BC or 8 BC i.e. during or just after the Roman conquest of Pannonia (bellum Pannonicum 14–9 BC), in which Vinucius played a leading role as governor of the neighbouring Roman province of Illyricum. The inscription states: "Marcus Vinucius...[patronymic], Consul [in 19 BC] ...[various official titles], governor of Illyricum, the first [Roman general] to advance across the river Danube, defeated in battle and routed an army of Dacians and Basternae, and subjugated the Cotini, Osi,...[missing tribal name] and Anartii to the power of the emperor Augustus and of the people of Rome." The inscription suggests that the population of the Hungarian Plain retained their Celtic character in the time of Augustus: the scholarly consensus is that the Cotini and Anartes were Celtic tribes and the Osi either Celts or Celticised Illyrians.

Slovakia
To the north-west, the argument has been advanced that Dacian was also prevalent in modern-day Slovakia and parts of Poland. The basis for this is the presumed Dacian occupation of the fortress of Zemplin in Slovakia in the era of Dacian king Burebista – whose campaigns outside Dacia have been dated c. 60 – 44 BC – and Ptolemy's location of two -dava placenames on the lower Vistula river in Poland.

The hypothesis of a Dacian occupation of Slovakia during the 1st century BC is contradicted by the archaeological evidence that this region featured a predominantly Celtic culture from c. 400 BC; and a sophisticated kingdom of the Boii Celtic tribe. Based in modern-day Bratislava during the 1st century BC, this polity issued its own gold and silver coinage (the so-called "Biatec-type" coins), which bear the names of several kings with recognised Celtic names. This kingdom is also evidenced by numerous Celtic-type fortified hill-top settlements (oppida), of which Zemplin is the foremost example in south-east Slovakia. Furthermore, the archaeological Puchov culture, present in Slovakia in this period, is considered Celtic by mainstream scholars. Some scholars argue that Zemplin was occupied by Burebista's warriors from about 60 BC onwards, but this is based on the presence of Dacian-style artefacts alongside the Celtic ones, which may simply have been cultural imports. But even if occupation by Dacian troops under Burebista actually occurred, it would probably have been brief, as in 44 BC Burebista died and his kingdom collapsed and split into 4 fragments. In any case, it does not follow that the indigenous population became Dacian-speakers during the period of Dacian control. Karol Pieta's discussion of the ethnicity of the Puchov people shows that opinion is divided between those who attribute the culture to a Celtic group – the Boii or Cotini are the leading candidates – and those who favour a Germanic group e.g. the Buri. Despite wide acknowledgement of Dacian influence, there is little support for the view that the people of this region were ethnic Dacians.

Poland
The hypothesis of a substantial Dacian population in the river Vistula basin is not widely supported among modern scholars, as this region is generally regarded as inhabited predominantly by Germanic tribes during the Roman imperial era e.g. Heather (2009).

Dacian vocabulary

Place names

Ptolemy gives a list of 43 names of towns in Dacia, out of which arguably 33 were of Dacian origin. Most of the latter included the suffix 'dava', meaning settlement or village. But, other Dacian names from his list lack the suffix, for example Zarmisegethusa regia = Zermizirga, and nine other names of Dacian origin seem to have been Latinised.

The Dacian linguistic area is characterised mainly with composite names ending in -dava, or variations such as -deva, -daua, -daba, etc. The settlement names ending in these suffixes are geographically grouped as follows:
 In Dacia: Acidava, Argedava, Argidava, Buridava, Cumidava, Dokidaua, Karsidaua, Klepidaua, Markodaua, Netindaua, Patridaua, Pelendova, *Perburidava, Petrodaua, Piroboridaua, Rhamidaua, Rusidava, Sacidaba, Sangidaua, Setidava, Singidaua, Sykidaba, Tamasidaua, Utidaua, Zargidaua, Ziridava, Zucidaua – 26 names altogether.
 In Lower Moesia (the present northern Bulgaria) and Scythia Minor (Dobruja): Aedabe, *Buteridava, *Giridava, Dausdavua, Kapidaua, Murideba, Sacidava, Scaidava (Skedeba), Sagadava, Sukidaua (Sucidava) – 10 names in total.
 In Upper Moesia (the present districts of Nish, Sofia, and partly Kjustendil): Aiadaba, Bregedaba, Danedebai, Desudaba, Itadeba, Kuimedaba, Zisnudeba – 7 names in total.

Besides these regions, similar village names are found in three other places:
 Thermi-daua (Ptolemy), a town in Dalmatia, a Grecised form of *Germidava. This settlement was probably founded by immigrants from Dacia.
 Gil-doba – a village in Thrace, of unknown location.
 Pulpu-deva in Thrace – today Plovdiv in Bulgaria.

A number of Dacian settlements do not have the -dava ending or variant suffix. Some of these are: Acmonia, Aizis, Amutria, Apulon, Arcina, Arcobadara, Arutela, Berzobis, Brucla, Diacum, Dierna, Dinogetia, Drobeta, Egeta, Genucla, Malva (Romula), Napoca, Oescus, Patruissa, Pinon, Potaissa, Ratiaria, Sarmizegetusa, Tapae, Tibiscum, Tirista, Tsierna, Tyrida, Zaldapa, Zeugma and Zurobara.

Tribal names

In the case of Ptolemy's Dacia, most of the tribal names are similar to those on the list of civitates, with few exceptions. Georgiev counts the Triballi, the Moesians and the Dardanians as Daco-Moesians.

Plant names

In ancient literary sources, the Dacian names for a number of medicinal plants and herbs survive in ancient texts, including about 60 plant names in Dioscorides. The Greek physician Pedanius Dioscorides, of Anazarbus in Asia Minor, wrote the medical textbook De Materia Medica in the mid-1st century AD. In Wellmann's opinion (1913), accepted by Russu (1967), the Dacian plant names were added in the 3rd century AD from a glossary published by the Greek grammarian Pamphilus of Alexandria (1st century AD). The Dacian glosses were probably added to the Pseudo-Apuleius texts by the 4th century. The mixture of indigenous Dacian, Latin and Greek words in the lists of Dacian plant names may be explained by a linguistic crossing process occurring in that period.

Although many Dacian toponyms have uncertain meanings, they are more reliable as sources of Dacian words than the names of medicinal plants provided by Dioscorides, which have led to speculative identifications: out of 57 plants, 25 identifications may be erroneous, according to Asher & Simpson. According to the Bulgarian linguist Decev, of the 42 supposedly Dacian plant names in Dioscorides only 25 are truly Dacian, while 10 are Latin and 7 Greek. Also, of the 31 "Dacian" plant names recorded by Pseudo-Apuleius, 16 are really Dacian, 9 are Latin and 8 are Greek.

Examples of common Dacian, Latin and Greek words in Pseudo-Apuleius:
 Dacian blis and Latin blitum (from Greek bliton for purple amaranth
 Dacian amolusta and Campanian amolocia for chamomile
 Dacian dracontos and Italic dracontes for rosemary

Reconstruction of Dacian words

Both Georgiev and Duridanov use the comparative linguistic method to decipher ancient Thracian and Dacian names, respectively. Georgiev (1977) argues that the meaning of an ancient placename in an unknown language can be deciphered by comparing it to its successor-names and to cognate placenames and words in other Indo-European languages, both ancient and modern. Georgiev considers decipherment by analysis of root-words alone to be devoid of scientific value. He gives several examples of his methodology, one of which refers to a town and river (a tributary of the Danube) in eastern Romania called Cernavodă, which in Slavic means "black water". The same town in antiquity was known as Ἀξίοπα (Axiopa) or Ἀξιούπολις (Axioupolis) and its river as the Ἀξιός (Axios). The working assumption is that Axiopa meant "black water" in Dacian, on the basis that Cernavodă is probably a calque of the ancient Dacian name. According to Georgiev, the likely IE root-word for Axios is *n̥-ks(e)y-no ("dark, black" cf. Avestan axsaena). On the basis of the known rules of formation of IE composite words, Axiopa would break down as axi = "black" and opa or upa = "water" in Dacian; the -polis element is ignored, as it is a Greek suffix meaning "city". The assumption is then validated by examining cognate placenames. There was another Balkan river also known in antiquity as Axios, whose source was in the Dacian-speaking region of Moesia: its modern Macedonian name is Crna reka (Slavic for "black river"): although it was in Dardania (Rep. of North Macedonia), a mainly Illyrian-speaking region. Georgiev considers this river-name to be of Daco-Moesian origin. The axi element is also validated by the older Greek name for the Black Sea, Ἄξεινος πόντος – Axeinos pontos, later altered to the euphemism Εὔξεινος πόντος Euxeinos pontos meaning "Hospitable sea". The opa/upa element is validated by the Lithuanian cognate upė, meaning "water"). The second component of the town's name *-upolis may be a diminutive of *upa cf. Lithuanian diminutive upelis.

[N.B. This etymology was questioned by Russu: Axiopa, a name attested to only in Procopius' De Aedificiis, may be a corrupted form of Axiopolis. However, even if correct, Russu's objection is irrelevant: it does not affect the interpretation of the axi- element as meaning "black", or the upa as meaning "water" cf. placename Scenopa. Fraser (1959) noted that the root axio that occurs in the place-name Axiopa is also found in Samothrace and in Sparta, where Athena Axiopoina was worshiped. Therefore, he considers this pre-Greek root to be of Thracian origin, meaning "great". However, there is no certainty that the axi element in Greece was of Thracian (as opposed to Greek or other language), or that it meant "great" rather than "black". In any case, this objection may not be relevant, if Thracian was a separate language to Dacian].

Some linguists are skeptical of this reconstruction methodology of Dacian. The phonetic systems of Dacian and Thracian and their evolution are not reconstructed directly from indigenous elements but from their approximative Greek or Latin transcripts. Greek and Latin had no dedicated graphic signs for phonemes such as č, ġ, ž, š and others. Thus, if a Thracian or Dacian word contained such a phoneme, a Greek or Latin transcript would not represent it accurately. The etymologies that are adduced to back up the proposed Dacian and Thracian vowel and consonant changes, used for word reconstruction with the comparative method, are open to divergent interpretations because the material is related to place names, with the exception of Dacian plant names and the limited number of glosses. Because of this, there are divergent and even contradictory assumptions for the phonological structure and development of the Dacian and Thracian languages. It is doubtful that the Dacian phonological system has been accurately reproduced by Greek or Latin transcripts of indigenous lexica.

In the case of personal names, the choice of the etymology is often a matter of compliance with assumed phonological rules. Since the geographical aspect of the occurrence of sound changes (i.e. o > a) within Thracian territory, based on the work of V. Georgiev, began to be emphasised by some researchers, the chronological aspect has been somewhat neglected. There are numerous cases where lack of information has obscured the vocalism of these idioms, generating the most contradictory theories. Today, some 3,000 Thraco-Dacian lexical units are known. In the case of the oscillation *o / *a, the total number of words containing it is about 30, many more than the ones cited by both Georgiev and Russu, and the same explanation is not valid for all of them.

Sound changes from Proto-Indo-European
Phonologically Dacian is a conservative Indo-European (IE) language. From the remaining fragments, the sound changes from Proto-Indo-European (PIE) to Dacian can be grouped as follows:

Short vowels
 PIE *a and *o appear as a.
 PIE accented *e, appears as ye in open syllable or ya in closed ones. Otherwise, PIE un-accented *e remains e.
 PIE *i was preserved in Dacian as i.

Long vowels
 PIE *ē and *ā appear as *ā
 PIE *ō was preserved as *ō

Diphthongs
 PIE *ai was preserved as *ai
 PIE *oi appears in Dacian as *ai
 PIE *ei evolution is not well reconstructed yet. It appears to be preserved to ei or that already passed to i.
 PIE *wa was preserved as *wa.
 PIE *wo appears as *wa.
 PIE *we was preserved as *we.
 PIE *wy appears as *vi.
 PIE *aw was preserved as *aw.
 PIE *ow appears as *aw.
 PIE *ew was preserved as *ew.

Consonants
Like many IE stocks, Dacian merged the two series of voiced stops.
 Both *d and *dh became d,
 Both *g and *gh became g
 Both *b and *bh became b
 PIE *ḱ became ts
 PIE *ǵ became dz
 PIE *kʷ when followed by e, i became t̠ʃ. Otherwise became k. Same fate for PIE cluster *kw.
 PIE *gʷ and *gʷh when followed by e or i became d̠ʒ. Otherwise became to g. Same fate for PIE cluster *gw
 PIE *m, *n, *p, *t, *r, *l were preserved.

Note: In the course of the diachronic development of Dacian, a palatalisation of k and g appears to have occurred before front vowels according to the following process
 k >   or  >   e.g.:*ker(s)na is reflected by Tierna (Tabula Peutingeriana) Dierna (in inscriptions and Ptolemy), *Tsierna in station Tsiernen[sis], AD 157, Zernae (notitia Dignitatum), (colonia) Zernensis (Ulpian)
 g >   e.g.:Germisara appears as Γερμιζερα, with the variants Ζερμιζίργα, Ζερμίζιργα

Linguistic classification
Dacian was an Indo-European language (IE). Russu (1967, 1969 and 1970) suggested that its phonological system, and therefore that of its presumed Thraco-Dacian parent-language, was relatively close to the primitive IE system.

Several linguists classify Dacian as a satem IE language: Russu, Rădulescu, Katičić and Križman. In Crossland's opinion (1982), both Thracian and Dacian feature one of the main satem characteristics, the change of Indo-European *k and *g to s and z. But the other characteristic satem changes are doubtful in Thracian and are not evidenced in Dacian. In any case, the satem/centum distinction, once regarded as a fundamental division between IE languages, is no longer considered as important in historical linguistics by mainstream scholars. It is now recognised that it is only one of many isoglosses in the IE zone; that languages can exhibit both types at the same time, and that these may change over time within a particular language. There is much controversy about the place of Dacian in the IE evolutionary tree. According to a dated view, Dacian derived from a Daco-Thraco-Phrygian (or "Paleo-Balkan") branch of IE. Today, the Phrygian is no longer widely seen as linked in this way to Dacian and Thracian.

In contrast, the hypothesis of a Thraco-Dacian or Daco-Thracian branch of IE, indicating a close link between the Thracian and Dacian languages, has numerous adherents, including Russu 1967, Georg Solta 1980, Vraciu 1980, Crossland 1982, Rădulescu 1984, 1987. Mihailov (2008) and Trask 2000. The Daco-Thracian theory is ultimately based on the testimony of several Greco-Roman authors: most notably the Roman imperial-era historian and geographer Strabo, who states that the Dacians, Getae, Moesians and Thracians all spoke the same language. Herodotus states that "the Getae are the bravest and the most just amongst the Thracians", linking the Getae, and thus the Dacians, with the Thracians. Some scholars also see support for a close link between the Thracian and Dacian languages in the works of Cassius Dio, Trogus Pompeius, Appian and Pliny the Elder.

But the Daco-Thracian theory has been challenged since the 1960s by the Bulgarian linguist Vladimir I. Georgiev and his followers. Georgiev argues, on phonetic, lexical and toponymic grounds, that Thracian, Dacian and Phrygian were completely different languages, each a separate branch of IE, and that no Daco-Thraco-Phrygian or Daco-Thracian branches of IE ever existed. Georgiev argues that the distance between Dacian and Thracian was approximately the same as that between the Armenian and Persian languages, which are completely different languages. In elaborating the phonology of Dacian, Georgiev uses plant-names attested to in Dioscorides and Pseudo-Apuleius, ascertaining their literal meanings, and hence their etymology, using the Greek translations provided by those authors. The phonology of Dacian produced in this way is very different from that of Thracian; the vowel change IE *o > *a recurs and the k-sounds undergo the changes characteristic of the satem languages. For the phonology of Thracian, Georgiev uses the principle that an intelligible placename in a modern language is likely to be a translation of an ancient name.

Georgiev (1977) also argues that the modern Albanian language is descended from Dacian, specifically from what he called Daco-Moesian or Daco-Mysian, the Moesian dialect of Dacian, but this view has not gained wide acceptance among scholars and is rejected by most Albanian linguists, who consider that Albanian belongs to the Illyrian branch of IE. Polomé accepts the view that Albanian is descended from Illyrian but considers the evidence inconclusive.

Relationship with ancient languages

Thracian

There is general agreement among scholars that Dacian and Thracian were Indo-European languages; however, widely divergent views exist about their relationship:
 Dacian was a northern dialect or a slightly distinct variety of the Thracian language. Alternatively, Thracian was a southern dialect of Dacian which developed relatively late. Linguists use the term Daco-Thracian or Thraco-Dacian to denote this presumed Dacian and Thracian common language. On this view, these dialects may have possessed a high degree of mutual intelligibility.
 Dacian and Thracian were distinct but related languages, descended from a hypothetical Daco-Thracian branch of Indo-European. One suggestion is that the Dacian differentiation from Thracian may have taken place after 1500 BC. In this scenario, the two languages may have possessed only limited mutual intelligibility.
 Dacian and Thracian were related, constituting separate branches of IE. However, they shared a large number of words, which were mutual borrowings due to long-term geographical proximity. Nevertheless, they would not have been mutually intelligible.

Georgiev (1977) and Duridanov (1985) argue that the phonetic development from proto-Indo-European of the two languages was clearly divergent.

Note: Asterisk indicates reconstructed PIE sound. ∅ is a zero symbol (no sound, when the sound has been dropped).

Georgiev and Duridanov argue that the phonetic divergences above prove that the Dacian and Thracian (and Phrygian, per Georgiev) languages could not have descended from the same branch of Indo-European, but must have constituted separate, stand-alone branches. However, the validity of this conclusion has been challenged due to a fundamental weakness in the source-material for sound-change reconstruction. Since the ancient Balkan languages never developed their own alphabets, ancient Balkan linguistic elements (mainly placenames and personal names) are known only through their Greek or Latin transcripts. These may not accurately reproduce the indigenous sounds e.g. Greek and Latin had no dedicated graphic signs for phonemes such as č, ġ, ž, š and others. Thus, if a Thracian or Dacian word contained such a phoneme, a Greek or Latin transcript would not represent it accurately. Because of this, there are divergent and even contradictory assumptions for the phonological structure and development of the Dacian and Thracian languages. This can be seen from the different sound-changes proposed by Georgiev and Duridanov, reproduced above, even though these scholars agree that Thracian and Dacian were different languages. Also, some sound-changes proposed by Georgiev have been disputed e.g. that IE *T (tenuis) became Thracian TA (tenuis aspiratae), and *M (mediae) = T: it has been argued that in both languages IE *MA (mediae aspiratae) fused into M and that *T remained unchanged. Georgiev's claim that IE *o mutated into a in Thracian, has been disputed by Russu.

A comparison of Georgiev's and Duridanov's reconstructed words with the same meaning in the two languages shows that, although they shared some words, many words were different. However, even if such reconstructions are accepted as valid, an insufficient quantity of words have been reconstructed in each language to establish that they were unrelated.

According to Georgiev (1977), Dacian placenames and personal names are completely different from their Thracian counterparts. However, Tomaschek (1883) and Mateescu (1923) argue that some common elements exist in Dacian and Thracian placenames and personal names, but Polomé considered that research had, by 1982, confirmed Georgiev's claim of a clear onomastic divide between Thrace and Moesia/Dacia.

Georgiev highlighted a striking divergence between placename-suffixes in Dacia/Moesia and Thrace: Daco-Moesian placenames generally carry the suffix -dava (variants: -daba, -deva), meaning "town" or "stronghold". But placenames in Thrace proper, i.e. south of the Balkan mountains commonly end in -para or -pera, meaning "village" or "settlement" (cf Sanskrit pura = "town", from which derives Hindi town-suffix -pur e.g. Udaipur = "city of Udai"). Map showing -dava/-para divide Georgiev argues that such toponymic divergence renders the notion that Thracian and Dacian were the same language implausible. However, this thesis has been challenged on a number of grounds:
 Papazoglu (1978) and Tacheva (1997) reject the argument that such different placename-suffixes imply different languages (although, in general historical linguistics, changes in placename-suffixes are regarded as potentially strong evidence of changes in prevalent language). A possible objection is that, in 2 regions of Thrace, -para is not the standard suffix: in NE Thrace, placenames commonly end in -bria ("town"), while in SE Thrace, -diza/-dizos ("stronghold") is the most common ending. Following Georgiev's logic, this would indicate that these regions spoke a language different from Thracian. It is possible that this was the case: NE Thrace, for example, was a region of intensive Celtic settlement and may, therefore, have retained Celtic speech into Roman imperial times. If, on the other hand, the different endings were due simply to Thracian regional dialectal variations, the same could be true of the dava/para divide.
 Papazoglu (1978) and Fisher (2003) point out that two -dava placenames are found in Thrace proper, in contravention of Georgiev's placename divide: Pulpudeva and Desudaba. However, according to Georgiev (1977), east of a line formed by the Nestos and Uskur rivers, the traditional western boundary of Thrace proper, Pulpudeva is the only known -dava-type placename, and Georgiev argues that it is not linguistically significant, as it was an extraneous and late foundation by the Macedonian king Philip II (Philippopolis) and its -dava name a Moesian import.
 The dava/para divide appears to break down West of the Nestos-Uskur line, where -dava placenames, including Desudaba, are intermingled with -para names. However, this does not necessarily invalidate Georgiev's thesis, as this region was the border-zone between the Roman provinces of Moesia Superior and Thracia and the mixed placename suffixes may reflect a mixed Thracian/Moesian population.

Georgiev's thesis has by no means achieved general acceptance: the Thraco-Dacian theory retains substantial support among linguists. Crossland (1982) considers that the divergence of a presumed original Thraco-Dacian language into northern and southern groups of dialects is not so significant as to rank them as separate languages. According to Georg Solta (1982), there is no significant difference between Dacian and Thracian. Rădulescu (1984) accepts that Daco-Moesian possesses a certain degree of dialectal individuality, but argues that there is no fundamental separation between Daco-Moesian and Thracian. Renfrew (1990) argues that there is no doubt that Thracian is related to the Dacian which was spoken in modern-day Romania before that area was occupied by the Romans. However, all these assertions are largely speculative, due to the lack of evidence for both languages.

Polomé (1982) considers that the evidence presented by Georgiev and Duridanov, although substantial, is not sufficient to determine whether Daco-Moesian and Thracian were two dialects of the same language or two distinct languages.

Moesian

The ethnonym Moesi was used within the lands alongside the Danube river, in north-western Thrace. As analysed by some modern scholars, the ancient authors used the name Moesi speculatively to designate Triballians and also Getic and Dacian communities.

Illyrian

It is possible that Illyrian, Dacian and Thracian were three dialects of the same language, according to Rădulescu. Georgiev (1966), however, considers Illyrian a language closely related to Venetic and Phrygian but with a certain Daco-Moesian admixture. Venetic and Phrygian are considered centum languages, and this may mean that Georgiev, like many other paleolinguists, viewed Illyrian as probably being a centum language with Daco-Moesian admixture. Georgiev proposed that Albanian, a satemised language, developed from Daco-Moesian, a satemised language group, and not from Illyrian. But lack of evidence prevents any firm centum/satem classification for these ancient languages. Renfrew argues that the centum/satem classification is irrelevant in determining relationships between languages. This is because a language may contain both satem and centum features and these, and the balance between them, may change over time.

Gothic

There was a well-established tradition in the 4th century that the Getae, believed to be Dacians by mainstream scholarship, and the Gothi were the same people e.g. Orosius: Getae illi qui et nunc Gothi. This identification, now discredited, was supported by Jacob Grimm. In pursuit of his hypothesis, Grimm proposed many kindred features between the Getae and Germanic tribes.

Relationship with modern languages

Romanian

The mainstream view among scholars is that Daco-Moesian forms the principal linguistic substratum of modern Romanian, a neo-Latin (Romance) language, which evolved from eastern Balkan Romance in the period AD 300–600, according to Georgiev. The possible residual influence of Daco-Moesian on modern Romanian is limited to a modest number of words and a few grammatical peculiarities. According to Georgiev (1981), in Romanian there are about 70 words which have exact correspondences in Albanian, but the phonetic form of these Romanian words is so specific that they cannot be explained as Albanian borrowings. These words belong to the Dacian substratum in Romanian, while their Albanian correspondences were inherited from Daco-Moesian.

As in the case of any Romance language, it is argued that Romanian language derived from Vulgar Latin through a series of internal linguistic changes and because of Dacian or northern Thracian influences on Vulgar Latin in the late Roman era. This influence explains a number of differences between the Romanian-Thracian substrate and the French-Celtic, Spanish-Basque, and Portuguese-Celtic substrates. Romanian has no major dialects, perhaps a reflection of its origin in a small mountain region, which was inaccessible but permitted easy internal communication. The history of Romanian is based on speculation because there are virtually no written records of the area from the time of the withdrawal of the Romans around 300 AD until the end of the barbarian invasions around 1300 AD.

Many scholars, mostly Romanian, have conducted research into a Dacian linguistic substratum for the modern Romanian language. There is still not enough hard evidence for this. None of the few Dacian words known (mainly plant-names) and none of the Dacian words reconstructed from placenames have specific correspondent words in Romanian (as opposed to general correspondents in several IE languages). DEX doesn't mention any Dacian etymology, just a number of terms of unknown origin. Most of these are assumed by several scholars to be of Dacian origin, but there is no strong proof that they are. They could, in some cases, also be of pre-Indo-European origin (i.e. truly indigenous, from Stone Age Carpathian languages), or, if clearly Indo-European, be of Sarmatian origin – but there's no proof for this either.
It seems plausible that a few Dacian words may have survived in the speech of the Carpathian inhabitants through successive changes in the region's predominant languages: Dacian/Celtic (to AD 100), Latin/Sarmatian (c. 100–300), Germanic (c. 300–500), Slavic/Turkic (c. 500–1300), up to the Romanian language when the latter became the predominant language in the region.

Substratum of Common Romanian

The Romanian language has been denoted "Daco-Romanian" by some scholars because it derives from late Latin superimposed on a Dacian substratum, and evolved in the Roman colony of Dacia between AD 106 and 275. Modern Romanian may contain 160–170 words of Dacian origin. By comparison, modern French, according to Bulei, has approximately 180 words of Celtic origin. The Celtic origin of the French substratum is certain, as the Celtic languages are abundantly documented, whereas the Dacian origin of Romanian words is in most cases speculative.

It is also argued that the Dacian language may form the substratum of Common Romanian, which developed from the Vulgar Latin spoken in the Balkans north of the Jirecek line, which roughly divides Latin influence from Greek influence. About 300 words in Balkan Romance languages, Daco-Romanian, Aromanian, Megleno-Romanian, Istro-Romanian, may derive from Dacian, and many of these show a satem-reflex. Whether Dacian forms the substratum of Common Romanian is disputed, yet this theory does not rely only on the Romanisation having occurred in Roman Dacia, as Dacian was also spoken in Moesia and northern Dardania. Moesia was conquered by the Romans more than a century before Dacia, and its Latinity is confirmed by Christian sources.

The Dacian / Thracian substratum of Romanian is often connected to the words shared between Romanian and Albanian. The correspondences between these languages reflect a common linguistic background. Linguists like Eric Hamp, PB.P.Hasdeu, I.I.Russu and many others, see the Romanian language as a completely Romanised Daco-Moesian (Albanoid) language, whereas Albanian is a partly Romanised Daco-Moesian language. However, Dacian and Illyrian may have been more similar than most linguists believe, according to Van Antwerp Fine.

Albanian

Russu asserts a Thraco-Dacian origin for the pre-Roman lexical items shared by Albanian and Romanian. He argues that the Albanians descend from the Carpi, which he considers a tribe of Free Dacians. By rejecting the thesis of Illyrian- Albanian identification, Georgiev concludes that the Albanians originated in modern-day Romania or Serbia and that their language developed during the 4th to 6th centuries, when Common Romanian appeared. Georgiev further suggested that Daco-Moesian is the ancestor of modern Albanian, based on the phonologies of the two languages. Based on certain marked lexical and grammatical affinities between Albanian and Romanian, he also suggested proto-Albanian speakers migrated from Dardania into the region where Albanian is spoken today. However, this theory is rejected by most Albanian linguists, who consider Albanian a direct descendant of ancient Illyrian. Polomé supports this view on balance, but considers the evidence inconclusive. Other linguists argue that Albanian is a direct descendant of the language of the Bessi, a Thracian tribe that lived in the Rhodope Mountains.
Many authors in general terms consider that Thraco-Illyrian branch including Dacian survived in a form of Albanian language.

Baltic languages
There is significant evidence of at least a long-term proximity link, and possibly a genetic link, between Dacian and the modern Baltic languages. The Bulgarian linguist Ivan Duridanov, in his first publication claimed that Thracian and Dacian are genetically linked to the Baltic languages and in the next one he made the following classification:"The Thracian language formed a close group with the Baltic (resp. Balto-Slavic), the Dacian and the "Pelasgian" languages. More distant were its relations with the other Indo-European languages, and especially with Greek, the Italic and Celtic languages, which exhibit only isolated phonetic similarities with Thracian; the Tokharian and the Hittite were also distant. "

Duridanov's cognates of the reconstructed Dacian words are found mostly in the Baltic languages, followed by Albanian without considering Thracian. Parallels have enabled linguists, using the techniques of comparative linguistics, to decipher the meanings of several Dacian and Thracian placenames with, they claim, a high degree of probability. Of 74 Dacian placenames attested in primary sources and considered by Duridanov, a total of 62 have Baltic cognates, most of which were rated "certain" by Duridanov. Polomé considers that these parallels are unlikely to be coincidence. Duridanov's explanation is that proto-Dacian and proto-Thracian speakers were in close geographical proximity with proto-Baltic speakers for a prolonged period, perhaps during the period 3000–2000 BC. A number of scholars such as the Russian Topоrov have pointed to the many close parallels between Dacian and Thracian placenames and those of the Baltic language-zone – Lithuania, Latvia and in East Prussia (where an extinct but well-documented Baltic language, Old Prussian, was spoken until it was displaced by German during the Middle Ages).

After creating a list of names of rivers and personal names with a high number of parallels, the Romanian linguist Mircea M. Radulescu classified the Daco-Moesian and Thracian as Baltic languages of the south and also proposed such classification for Illyrian. The German linguist Schall also attributed a southern Baltic classification to Dacian. The American linguist Harvey Mayer refers to both Dacian and Thracian as Baltic languages. He claims to have sufficient evidence for classifying them as Baltoidic or at least "Baltic-like," if not exactly, Baltic dialects or languages and classifies Dacians and Thracians as "Balts by extension". According to him, Albanian, the descendant of Illyrian, escaped any heavy Baltic influence of Daco-Thracian. Mayer claims that he extracted an unambiguous evidence for regarding Dacian and Thracian as more tied to Lithuanian than to Latvian. The Czech archaeologist Kristian Turnvvald classified Dacian as Danubian Baltic. The Venezuelan-Lithuanian historian Jurate de Rosales classifies Dacian and Thracian as Baltic languages.

It appears from the study of hydronyms (river and lake names) that Baltic languages once predominated much farther eastwards and southwards than their modern confinement to the southeastern shores of the Baltic sea, and included regions that later became predominantly Slavic-speaking. The zone of Baltic hydronyms extends along the Baltic coast from the mouth of the Oder as far as Riga, eastwards as far as the line Yaroslavl–Moscow–Kursk and southwards as far as the line Oder mouth–Warsaw–Kyiv–Kursk: it thus includes much of northern and eastern Poland, Belarus and central European Russia.

Dacian as an Italic language
Another theory maintains that the Dacians spoke a language akin to Latin and that the people who settled in the Italian Peninsula shared the same ancestors.

The Romanian philologist Nicolae Densușianu argued in his book Dacia Preistorică (Prehistoric Dacia), published in 1913, that Latin and Dacian were the same language or were mutually intelligible. His work was considered by mainstream linguists to be pseudoscience. It was reprinted under the regime of Nicolae Ceaușescu. The first article to revive Densușianu's theory was an unsigned paper, "The Beginnings of the History of the Romanian People", included in Anale de istorie, a journal published by the Romanian Communist Party's Institute of Historical and Social-Political Studies. The article claimed that the Thracian language was a pre-Romance or Latin language. Arguments used in the article include for instance the absence of interpreters between the Dacians and the Romans, as depicted on the bas-reliefs of Trajan's column. The bibliography mentions, apart from Densușianu, the work of French academician Louis Armand, an engineer who allegedly showed that "the Thraco-Dacians spoke a pre-Romance language". Similar arguments are found in Iosif Constantin Drăgan's We, the Thracians (1976). About the same time Ion Horațiu Crișan wrote "Burebista and His Age" (1975). Nevertheless, the theory didn't rise to official status under Ceaușescu's rule.

Opinions about a hypothetical latinity of Dacian can be found in earlier authors: Sextus Rufus (Breviarum C.VIII, cf. Bocking Not, Dign. II, 6), Ovid (Trist. II, 188–189) and Horace (Odes, I, 20).

Iosif Constantin Drăgan and the New York City-based physician Napoleon Săvescu continued to support this theory and published a book entitled We Are Not Rome's Descendants. They also published a magazine called Noi, Dacii ("Us Dacians") and organised a yearly "International Congress of Dacology".

Less radical theories have suggested that Dacian was either Italic or Celtic, like the speakers of those Indo-European languages in Western Europe who became Latinized and now speak Romance languages.

The fate of Dacian

From the earliest times that they are attested, Dacians lived on both sides of Danube and on both sides of the Carpathians, evidenced by the northern Dacian town Setidava. It is unclear exactly when the Dacian language became extinct, or whether it has a living descendant. The first Roman conquest of part of Dacia did not extinguish the language, as Free Dacian tribes may have continued to speak Dacian in the area north-east of the Carpathians as late as the 6th or 7th century AD. According to one hypothesis, a branch of Dacian continued as the Albanian language (Hasdeu, 1901). Another hypothesis (Marius A.) considers Albanian to be a Daco-Moesian dialect that split off from Dacian before 300 BC and that Dacian itself became extinct. However, mainstream scholarship considers Albanian to be a descendant of the Illyrian language and not a dialect of Dacian. In this scenario, Albanian/Romanian cognates are either Daco-Moesian loanwords acquired by Albanian, or, more likely, Illyrian loanwords/substrate words acquired by Romanian.

The argument for a split before 300 BC is that inherited Albanian words (e.g. Alb motër 'sister' < Late IE *ma:ter 'mother') show the transformation Late IE /aː/ > Alb /o/, but all the Latin loans in Albanian having an /aː/ show Latin /aː/ > Alb a. This indicates that the transformation PAlb /aː/ > PAlb /o/ happened and ended before the Roman arrival in the Balkans. However, Romanian substratum words shared with Albanian show a Romanian /a/ that corresponds to an Albanian /o/ when the source of both sounds is an original common /aː/ (mazăre / modhull < *maːdzula 'pea', rață / rosë < *raːtjaː 'duck'), indicating that when these words had the same common form in Pre-Romanian and Proto-Albanian, the transformation PAlb /aː/ > PAlb /o/ had not yet begun. The correlation between these two theories indicates that the hypothetical split between the pre-Roman Dacians, who were later Romanised, and Proto-Albanian happened before the Romans arrived in the Balkans.

Extinction
According to Georgiev, Daco-Moesian was replaced by Latin as the everyday language in some parts of the two Moesiae during the Roman imperial era, but in others, for instance Dardania in modern-day southern Serbia and northern North Macedonia, Daco-Moesian remained dominant, although heavily influenced by eastern Balkan Latin. The language may have survived in remote areas until the 6th century. Thracian, also supplanted by Latin, and by Greek in its southern zone, is documented as a living language in approximately 500 AD.

See also
 List articles
 List of ancient cities in Thrace and Dacia
 List of Dacian kings
 List of Dacian names
 List of Dacian plant names
 List of Dacian towns
 List of reconstructed Dacian words
 Substrate in Romanian
 Other articles
 Albanian language
 Daco-Thracian
 Davae
 Megleno-Romanian language
 Thracian language
 Thraco-Roman
 Paleo-Balkan languages
 Phrygian language
 Scythian languages
 Sinaia lead plates

Notes

Footnotes

Citations

Works cited

Ancient

Modern

 

; originally Culturpflanzen und Haustiere in ihrem Übergang aus Asien nach Griechenland und Italien sowie das übrige Europa: Historisch-linguistische Skizzen. Berlin: Gebr. Borntraeger, 1885

 (online?)

Further reading

Ancient

 Ammianus Marcellinus Res Gestae (c. 395)
 Jordanes Getica (c. 550)
 Sextus Aurelius Victor De Caesaribus (361)
 Zosimus Historia Nova (c. 500)

Modern

 CIL: Corpus Inscriptionum Latinarum

External links

 Evidence for an Italic substratum of Romanian, by Keith Andrew Massey

 
Extinct languages of Europe
Unclassified Indo-European languages